Huizhou Pingtan Airport  is a dual-use military and civil airport serving the city of Huizhou in Guangdong Province, China.  It is located in the town of Pingtan in Huiyang District, 20 kilometers from the city center.  The military airport served commercial flights between 1985 and 2002, but stopped when the military was forbidden to operate commercial businesses.

The military airport was first built in the 1950s. In March 2011, the Huizhou city government reached agreement with the Guangdong Airport Group to redevelop the airport for civilian use. The proposal received approval from the national government and the central military commission on 8 April 2014. Construction began on 25 June 2014, and the airport was reopened on 5 February 2015.

Airlines and destinations

See also
List of airports in China
List of the busiest airports in China
List of People's Liberation Army Air Force airbases

References

External links

Airports in Guangdong
Chinese Air Force bases
Airports established in 2015
Huizhou
2015 establishments in China